Sergei Yevgenyevich Kiryakov (born 15 July 1998) is a Russian football player. He plays for FC Kairat Moscow.

Club career
He made his debut in the Russian Football National League for FC Akron Tolyatti on 1 August 2020 in a game against FC Fakel Voronezh, as a starter.

References

External links
 
 Profile by Russian Football National League
 

1998 births
Sportspeople from Rostov-on-Don
Living people
Russian footballers
Association football defenders
FC Rostov players
FC Tyumen players
FC Akron Tolyatti players